Forging the Eclipse is the fifth studio album by German melodic death metal band Neaera. It was released on 26 October 2010 through Metal Blade Records.

Track listing

Personnel

Neaera
Benjamin Hilleke – Vocals
Tobias Buck – Guitar
Stefan Keller – Guitar
Benjamin Donath – Bass Guitar
Sebastian Heldt – Drums

Credits
Erode – Synthesizer on "The Forging", arranger, composer, Mixing, engineer
Alexander Dietz – Producer, engineer
Andy Classes – Drum Engineering
Paul Celan – Poetry
Tue Madsen – Mastering, Mixing
Neaera – Composer, producer

References

2010 albums
Neaera (band) albums
Metal Blade Records albums